Karl Walz (22 October 1900 – 17 April 1990) was a German politician of the Christian Democratic Union (CDU) and former member of the German Bundestag.

Life 
In 1953 Walz was elected to the German Bundestag on the Rhineland-Palatinate CDU state list and was therefore expatriated from Saarland. He then settled in Trier together with his family until the referendum. In the Bundestag he was one of the opponents of the Saar Statute.

Literature

References

1900 births
1990 deaths
Members of the Bundestag for Rhineland-Palatinate
Members of the Bundestag 1953–1957
Members of the Bundestag for the Christian Democratic Union of Germany
Knights Commander of the Order of Merit of the Federal Republic of Germany
Recipients of the Saarland Order of Merit